Hevossalmi  (Finnish), Hästnässund (Swedish) is a southeastern neighborhood of Helsinki, Finland.

Neighbourhoods of Helsinki